Abu Mosa was a press officer for the Islamic State. In a documentary video made by Vice News reporter Medyan Daireh, he threatened the US and said "we will raise the flag of Allah in the White House". He also threatened to "liberate Istanbul". He was killed by an air strike on 22 August 2014 by the Syrian army in an attack for al-Tabqa air base in Raqqa Governorate during the Syrian Civil War. It was confirmed by U.S. Department of State.

References

Date of birth unknown
2014 deaths
Press secretaries
Syrian propagandists
Islamic State of Iraq and the Levant propagandists
Islamic State of Iraq and the Levant members from Syria
Assassinated ISIL members
Deaths by American airstrikes during the Syrian civil war